Priska Nufer (born 11 February 1992) is a Swiss World Cup alpine ski racer, and specializes in the speed events of downhill and super-G.

Nufer has competed at three World Championships, the first in 2015 at Beaver Creek, USA, in the super-G event. She also represented Switzerland at the 2022 Winter Olympics in Beijing, China, in the combined event.

After the Olympics, Nufer won her first World Cup race in late February 2022, a downhill on home-country snow in Crans-Montana, which was also her first podium (and eighth top ten).

World Cup results

Season standings
{| class=wikitable style="text-align:center"
!Season !! Age !!  Overall  !!  Slalom  !! Giant slalom  !! Super-G !! Downhill !!Combined

|-
| 2012 ||20|| 115 || — || — || — || — || 38
|-
| 2014 ||22|| 88 || — || — || 44 || 47 || 21
|-
| 2015 ||23|| 79 || — || — || 32 || 46 || 22
|-
| 2016 ||24|| 94 || — || — || 48 || 41 || 38
|-
| 2017 ||25|| 67 || — || — ||29 || 32 || 30
|-
| 2018 ||26|| 47 || — || — ||23 || 31 || 12
|-
| 2019 ||27|| 64 || — || — ||34 || 36 || 8
|-
| 2020 ||28|| 48 || — || — ||27 || 29 || 21
|-
| 2021 ||29|| 26 || — || 38 ||14 || 17 || rowspan="3" 
|-
| 2022 ||30||28||— ||—||36|| 9
|-
| 2023 ||31||53||—||—||26||23|}

Race podiums
 1 win (1 DH)
 1 podium – (1 DH); 10 top tens

World Championship results

Olympic results

References

External links

 Priska Nufer at Swiss Ski Team  
 ''

1992 births
Swiss female alpine skiers
Living people
Place of birth missing (living people)
Alpine skiers at the 2022 Winter Olympics
Olympic alpine skiers of Switzerland
21st-century Swiss women